Kazys Markevičius (28 January 1905 – 21 August 1980) was a Lithuanian boxer.

Markevičius competed at the 1928 Summer Olympics in Amsterdam, he entered the men's lightweight contest, but in the first round he lost on points to Frenchman, Georges Carcagne, so he didn't advance any further.

References

1905 births
1980 deaths
Sportspeople from Liepāja
Lightweight boxers
Olympic boxers of Lithuania
Boxers at the 1928 Summer Olympics
Lithuanian emigrants to the United States
Lithuanian male boxers